As part of human exploration of the Moon, numerous space missions have been undertaken to study Earth's natural satellite. Of the Moon landings, Luna 2 of the Soviet Union was the first spacecraft to reach its surface successfully, intentionally impacting the Moon on 13 September 1959. In 1966, Luna 9 became the first spacecraft to achieve a controlled soft landing, while Luna 10 became the first mission to enter orbit.

Between 1968 and 1972, crewed missions to the Moon were conducted by the United States as part of the Apollo program. Apollo 8 was the first crewed mission to enter orbit in December 1968, and it was followed by Apollo 10 in May 1969. Six missions landed humans on the Moon, beginning with Apollo 11 in July 1969, during which Neil Armstrong became the first person to walk on the Moon. Apollo 13 was intended to land; however, it was restricted to a flyby due to a malfunction aboard the spacecraft. All nine crewed missions returned safely to the Earth.

While the United States focused on the crewed Apollo program, the Soviet Union conducted uncrewed missions that deployed rovers and returned samples to the Earth. Three rover missions were launched, of which two were successful, and eleven sample return flights were attempted with three successes.

Missions to the Moon have been conducted by the following nations and entities (in chronological order): the Soviet Union, the United States, Japan, the European Space Agency, China, India, Luxembourg, Israel, Italy, and South Korea. The Moon has also been visited by five spacecraft not dedicated to studying it; four spacecraft have flown past it to gain gravity assistance, and a radio telescope, Explorer 49, was placed into selenocentric orbit in order to use the Moon to block interference from terrestrial radio sources.

Missions by date

Future missions
There are several future lunar missions scheduled or proposed by various nations or organisations.

Funded and under development

Robotic

Crewed

Proposed but full funding still unclear

Robotic 
The following robotic space probe missions have been proposed:

Lunar missions by organization/company

Unrealized concepts

2010s 
 Resource Prospector – concept by NASA of a rover that would have performed a survey expedition on a polar region of the Moon. It was canceled in April 2018.

See also 

 List of artificial objects on the Moon
List of extraterrestrial orbiters
List of lunar probes
List of missions to Mars
 Timeline of Solar System exploration

References

External links 
 Interactive map of every successful moon landings to date

Missions to the Moon